Equity & Excellence in Education is a peer-reviewed open access academic journal. It was founded in 1960 and is published by Taylor & Francis.  It is indexed in services including IBZ and ERIC.

In the "Aims and Scope", the editors "recommend that prior to submitting a manuscript to the Journal, authors read the freely accessible editorial to Volume 54, Issue 1: 'Call Us by Our Names: A Kitchen-Table Dialogue on Doin' It for the Culture'."

 the journal's three most-read articles are: "Five Essential Components for Social Justice Education", "From Classmates to Inmates: An Integrated Approach to Break the School-to-Prison Pipeline" and "I’m Here for the Hard Re-Set: Post Pandemic Pedagogy to Preserve Our Culture".

References

Education journals